Artena is a genus of moths in the family Erebidae. The genus was erected by Francis Walker in 1858.

Species
 Artena angulata (Roepke, 1938)
 Artena certior (Walker, 1858)
 Artena convergens (Gaede, 1917)
 Artena dotata (Fabricius, 1794)
 Artena durfa (Plotz, 1880)
 Artena eccentrica Yoshimoto, 1999
 Artena inversa (Walker, 1858)
 Artena lacteicincta (Hampson, 1912)
 Artena rubida (Walker, 1863)
 Artena submira Walker, 1858
 Artena velutina L. B. Prout, 1919

Alberto Zilli and Willem Hogenes raised Artena velutina, originally described as a subspecies of Artena rubida, to species status in 2004.

References

Ophiusini
Moth genera